Portfield is a suburb of Christchurch, Dorset.

Services 

Portfield is served by Portfield School. a special school for children with autism, and a community hall.

Transport 
Portfield is just to the north of Christchurch railway station.

Schools 

 Christchurch Junior School
 Christchurch Infant School

Politics 
Portfield is part of the Bournemouth, Christchurch and Poole Council. Portfield is part of the Christchurch parliamentary constituency for elections to the House of Commons. It is currently represented by Conservative MP Christopher Chope.

References 

Areas of Christchurch, Dorset